Yitzhak Kariv (1902 in Russia – 1999) was the mayor of West Jerusalem from 1952 to 1955, and a banker.

As a member of the Mizrachi political party, he was appointed as a compromise between the parties of the city hall, after Jerusalem's first elected mayor, Zalman Shragai, had resigned. In April 1955, a few months before the following elections, he was fired by the Minister of Interior, who replaced him with an appointed committee (ועדה קרואה).

References

1902 births
1999 deaths
Mayors of Jerusalem
Israeli Orthodox Jews
Soviet emigrants to Mandatory Palestine